The 2003 AFL draft was the 2003 instance of the AFL draft, the annual draft of talented players by Australian rules football teams that participate in the main competition of that sport, the Australian Football League. The 2003 draft consisted of a trade period, the national, pre-season and rookie drafts and the elevation of previously drafted rookies to the senior list.

There were 83 draft selections between the 16 teams in the national draft.  The Western Bulldogs received the first pick in the national draft after finishing on the bottom of the ladder during the 2003 AFL season.  The Bulldogs and Melbourne both received a priority selection for having earned 20 premiership points of less during the preceding season. Carlton also received a priority selection, despite being banned from the first two rounds of this year's draft, owing to salary cap breaches discovered the previous year.

This draft is considered one of the weaker drafts, with almost half of the 16 club's first picks delisted within the following 4 years. It has produced one Brownlow Medallist, Adam Cooney, who is the first and, as of 2021, only number-one draft pick to win the award.

The main trades that occurred involved Nathan Brown switching from the Bulldogs to Richmond and Trent Croad returning to Hawthorn after spending two years with Fremantle. The trading period also contained The Veale Deal, where unknown youngster Lochlan Veale was traded by Hawthorn to the Western Bulldogs in a lopsided three-way deal involving Essendon.  In the deal Hawthorn gained Danny Jacobs, Essendon gained Mark Alvey and the number six selection in the draft and the Bulldogs officially only received Veale, and had an understanding Hawthorn that they would not trade Jade Rawlings to any other club, allowing the Bulldogs to select him with the first selection in the pre-season draft.

Trades

2003 national draft

2004 pre-season draft

2004 rookie draft

Rookie elevation
In alphabetical order of professional clubs. This list details 2003-listed rookies who were elevated to the senior list; it does not list players taken as rookies in the rookie draft which occurred during the 2003/04 off-season.

References

2003 National draft list
2004 Pre-season draft list
2004 Rookie draft list

AFL Draft
Australian Football League draft
VFL Draft